Bacidiopsora is a genus of lichenized fungi in the family Ramalinaceae.

Species list

Bacidiopsora microphyllina
Bacidiopsora orizabana
Bacidiopsora psorina
Bacidiopsora silvicola
Bacidiopsora squamulosula
Bacidiopsora tenuisecta

References

Ramalinaceae
Lichen genera
Lecanorales genera
Taxa named by Klaus Kalb
Taxa described in 1988